The term choice theory is the work of William Glasser, MD, author of the book so named, and is the culmination of some 50 years of theory and practice in psychology and counseling.

Characteristics
Choice theory posits behaviors we choose are central to our existence. Our behavior (choices) are driven by five genetically driven needs in hierarchical order: survival and love, power, freedom, and fun.

The most basic human needs are survival (physical component) and love (mental component).  Without physical (nurturing) and emotional (love), an infant will not survive to attain power, freedom and fun.

“No matter how well-nourished and intellectually stimulated a child is, going without human touch can stunt his mental, emotional and even physical growth”, www.livestrong.com/article/508221- the-influence-of-touch-on-child- development
     
“Touching empathy: lack of physical affection can actually kill babies”, Psychology Today, October 1, 2010.

Survival needs include:
 Food
 Clothing
 Shelter
 Breathing
 personal safety
 security and sex, having children
And four fundamental psychological needs:
 Belonging/connecting/love
 Power/significance/competence
 Freedom/autonomy
 Fun/learning

Choice theory suggests the existence of a "Quality World". Glasser's idea of a "Quality World" restates the Jungian idea of archetypes but Glasser never acknowledged this. Nonetheless, Glasser's "Quality World" and what Jung would call healthy archetypes are indistinguishable.

Our "Quality World" images are our role models of an individual's "perfect" world of parents, relations, possessions, beliefs, etc. How each person's "Quality World" is somewhat unusual, even in the same family of origin, is taken for granted.

Starting from birth and continuing throughout our lives, each person places significant role models, significant possessions and significant systems of belief (religion, cultural values, and icons, etc.) into a mostly unconscious framework Glasser called our "Quality World". Glasser mostly ignores the issues of negative role models and stereotypes in choice theory.

Glasser also posits a "Comparing Place" where we compare-contrast our perception of people, places, and things immediately in front of us against our ideal images (archetypes) of these in our Quality World framework. Our subconscious pushes us towards calibrating—as best we can—our real world experience with our Quality World (archetypes).

Behavior ("Total Behavior" in Glasser's terms) is made up of these four components: acting, thinking, feeling, and physiology. Glasser suggests we have considerable control or choice over the first two of these; yet, little ability to directly choose the latter two as they are more deeply sub- and unconscious. These four components remain closely intertwined, the choices we make in our thinking and acting will greatly affect our feeling and physiology.

A big conclusion for Glasser, one he repeats often, is that the source of much personal unhappiness is failing or failed relationships with people important to us: spouses, parents, children, friends and colleagues.

The symptoms of unhappiness are widely variable and are often seen as mental illness. Glasser believed that "pleasure" and "happiness" are related but are far from synonymous. Sex, for example, is a "pleasure" but may well be divorced from a "satisfactory relationship" which is a precondition for lasting "happiness" in life. Hence the intense focus on the improvement of relationships in counseling with choice theory—the "new reality therapy". Those familiar with both are likely to prefer choice theory, the more modern formulation.

Choice theory posits most mental illness is, in fact, an expression of unhappiness. Glasser champions how we are able to learn and choose alternate behaviors resulting in greater personal satisfaction. Reality therapy is the choice theory-based counseling process focused on helping clients to learn to make those self-optimizing choices.

The Ten Axioms of Choice 
 The only person whose behavior we can control is our own.
 All we can give another person is information.
 All long-lasting psychological problems are relationship problems.
 The problem relationship is always part of our present life.
 What happened in the past has everything to do with what we are today, but we can only satisfy our basic needs right now and plan to continue satisfying them in the future.
 We can only satisfy our needs by satisfying the pictures in our Quality World.
 All we do is behave.
 All behavior is Total Behavior and is made up of four components: acting, thinking, feeling and physiology
 All Total Behavior is chosen, but we only have direct control over the acting and thinking components. We can only control our feeling and physiology indirectly through how we choose to act and think.
 All Total Behavior is designated by verbs and named by the part that is the most recognizable.

In Classroom Management 
William Glasser's choice theory begins: behavior is not separate from choice; we all choose how to behave at any time. Second, we cannot control anyone's behavior but our own. Glasser also believed in the vitality of classroom meetings for the purpose of improving communication and solving real classroom problems. In the classroom, it is important for teachers to "help students envision a quality existence in school and plan the choices that lead to it".

For example, Johnny Waits is an 18-year-old high school senior and plans on attending college to become a computer programmer. Glasser suggests Johnny could be learning as much as he can about computers instead of reading Plato. This concept is called quality curriculum, which connects students with practical real world topics, chosen by the student according to their leanings. Topics with actual career potential are most encouraged. Under Glasser's strategy, teachers hold discussions with students when introducing new topics asking them to identify what they would like to explore in depth. As part of the process, students need to explain why the material is valuable in life.

Education
Glasser was not a supporter of Summerhill. Most quality schools he supervised had very conventional curriculum topics. The main innovation was a deeper, humanistic approach to group process between teacher, student and learning.

Critiques 
In a book review, Christopher White writes, "Dr. Glasser postulates that everything contained in the DSM-IV-TR is a result of an individual's brain creatively expressing its unhappiness. Dr. Glasser demonizes the entire profession as charlatans who have been brainwashed by their predecessors or who simply misrepresent many of the psychiatric illnesses to patients as having a biological basis. Despite claiming to have an appendix full of references demonstrating there is no evidence medications have a role in curing mental illness, the book simply relies on a core group of anti-establishment authors. However, what is noticeably absent from the book is a set of randomized clinical trials demonstrating the success of his teachings."

See also
 Cognitive psychology
 Introspection illusion
 Léopold Szondi

References

 Bourbon, W. Thomas and Ford, Ed. (1994) Discipline at Home and at School. Brandt: New York.
 Personal observations (1996–2005). Teacher. Centennial High School, Champaign, Illinois.
 Weinstein, Jay. (2000). "The Place of Theory in Applied Sociology: A Reflection." Theory and Science 1, 1.

External links
 The William Glasser Institute official website
 The Sudbury Valley School official website

Cognitive science